Harry Carr was a writer.

Harry Carr may also refer to:

Harry Carr (cricketer) (1907–1943), English cricketer and journalist
Harry Carr (footballer) (1882–1942), English footballer for Sunderland
Harry Carr (jockey) (1916–1985), English Derby-winning jockey

See also
Henry Carr (disambiguation)
Harold Carr (disambiguation)